This is a list of caves in Lebanon.

List

Achtarout
Afqa
Ain al-Bared
Ain Seraaya
Ain al-Libné
Ain Chara
al-Aaouamide
al-Ain
al-Choériyeh
al-Daamiyé
al-Dabaa 
al-Haoua 1
al-Jiyyé
al-Kassarate
al-Mhadded
al-Rihane
al-Rmeïlé
al-Saouda 
al-Souwwane
al-Tallé
al-Terrache 
an-Nouâhir
Birket Aanjar
Dechouniyé
Dominou 
er-Roueiss
Fakhreddine
Fnaïdeq
Hanna Boustani
Haskane
Jbab
Jeita
Joualmane
Kafarhim
Kfar Sghab
Kfar Zabad
Lehfed
Mabaage
Mar Assia
Mar Challita
Mar Sarkis
Marj ed-Debb
Mikha
Nabaa al-Chataoui
Nabaa al-Hadid
Nabaa al-Jaouz
Nabaa al-Jouaïzat
Nabaa al-Kiddab
Nabaa al-Mghara
Nabaa al-Moutrane
Nabaa al-Saqié (al-fawqa)
Nabaa al-Saqié (al-tahta)
Nabaa Bou Safi
Nabaa ech-Cheikh
Nabaa er-Rahoué
Nabaa Ghaouaghit
Nabaa Hayssa
Nabaa Iskandar
Nabaa Qatra
Nachcharini
Ouadi al-Hadid
Qadisha
Qashqoush
Ras al-Nabaa
Ras Beyrouth
Ras El Kelb
Rechmi
Saddiqîne
Saleh
Salem
Touaïté
zbaïne
Zob Atta
Zod

See also 
 List of caves
 Speleology

References

 
Lebanon
Caves